Group A of the EuroBasket Women 2015 took place between 11 and 15 June 2015. The group played all of its games at Politehnica University of Timișoara in Timișoara, Romania.

The group composed of Czech Republic, France, Montenegro, Romania and Ukraine. The three best ranked teams advanced to the second round.

Standings

All times are local (UTC+3).

11 June

Montenegro vs Czech Republic

Ukraine vs France

12 June

Czech Republic vs Ukraine

Romania vs Montenegro

13 June

France vs Czech Republic

Ukraine vs Romania

14 June

Montenegro vs Ukraine

Romania vs France

15 June

France vs Montenegro

Czech Republic vs Romania

External links
Official website

Group A
2014–15 in French basketball
2014–15 in Montenegrin basketball
2014–15 in Czech basketball
2014–15 in Ukrainian basketball
2014–15 in Romanian basketball